The 1985 South Pacific Mini Games were held at Rarotonga in the  Cook Islands from 31 July to 9 August 1985. It was the second edition of the South Pacific Mini Games.

The new stadium built for the games had a grass track but several South Pacific Games athletics records were broken at the 1985 games including the women's 800 metres. The track and field competition also served as a selection trial for the Oceania team to compete at the IAAF World Cup in Canberra.

Participating countries
Sixteen Pacific nations participated in the Games:

Sports
Six sports were contested at the 1985 South Pacific Mini Games:

Final medal table
Papua New Guinea topped the medal count:

See also
Athletics at the 1985 South Pacific Mini Games

References

Sources

Pacific Games by year
Pacific Games
Pacific Mini Games
 
1985 in the Cook Islands
International sports competitions hosted by the Cook Islands
Pacific Mini Games
Pacific Mini Games